Cecima is a comune (municipality) in the Province of Pavia in the Italian region Lombardy, located about 70 km south of Milan and about 35 km south of Pavia.

Cecima borders the following municipalities: Brignano-Frascata, Godiasco, Gremiasco, Momperone, Ponte Nizza, Pozzol Groppo.

References

External links
 Official website

Cities and towns in Lombardy